The Shirali Maha Ganapathi Mahammaya Temple is the Kuladevata Temple (family temple) of the Goud Saraswat Brahmin community. The temple deity is a Kuladev of the Kamaths, Bhats, Puraniks, Prabhus, Joishys, Mallyas, Kudvas and Nayak families from the Goud Saraswat Brahmin community. The temple is located at Shirali in the Uttar Kannada district of Karnataka state. It is a five-minute drive from either Bhatkal or Murdeshwar. The Temple was built about 400 years ago. It was renovated in 1904.

These families are referred to as the Kulavis of the temple. The temple was established by devotees who migrated from Goa about 400–500 years ago. The presiding deities are Shri Mahaganapati (Vinayaka) and Shri Mahamaya (Shantadurga).

The deities were moved from Ella in Goa to nearby Golthi and Naveli. Golthi / Goltim and Naveli / Navelim are located in Divar Island, Tiswadi Taluka of Goa.  Shri Gomanteshwar and his affiliated deities still remain in Ella in Brahmapur. The older temple has been destroyed. On account of the hostile religious policies pursued by the Portuguese rulers around 1560, the devotees left Goltim and Navelim after the temple destruction. Unable to take with them the idols, they invoked the ‘saanidhya’ or the presence of the deities in the silver trunk of Lord Ganesha and the mask of goddess Mahamaya. When they reached Bhatkal they were unable to construct a temple immediately and kept these two symbols in a shop belonging to a devotee. Later on they constructed a temple in Shirali, a few miles north of Bhatkal, where it stands to this day. The deities are also called Pete Vinayaka and Shantadurga as they are located in a "pete", which means a town in Kannada. The temple has a unique darshan seva called, "mali".

According to the Archaeological Survey of Goa, The idol of Mahaganapati and Mahamaya (also referred as Durgadevi and Shantadurga) were located in Ella - Tiswadi Goa along with Shri Gomanteshwar and its affiliates. During the Muslim invasion in Goa (13th century) the temple in Ella was destroyed and the idols were transferred to Navelim and Goltim. Until the early 16th century, the deities were worshiped on the island, following which they were evicted by the overzealous Portuguese missionaries. The devotees had no choice but to transfer the idols to Khandepar and from there to its final destination Khandola. During the zealous Portuguese missionary acts, many devotees fled Goa and entered Karnataka. Traces of which,  can still be found today. Along the way to Karnataka, families that settled in Karwar established a temple in Asnoti. For those who settled in Ankola, the sacred coconut of Shantadurga/ Durgadevi/ Mahamaya found no place at homes and was kept at the local temple to worship. Many years later, the local deity came to be known as Shantadurga. Some families went far ahead from northern Karnataka to the south coast of Bhatkal, where they felt secure and thus, established a temple of Ganesha and Mahamaya. Today, the original 13th-century idol of Ganesha of Ella/Navelim is still worshiped in Khandola. At a distance is the temple of Shantadurga brought from Goltim/Ella. The affiliates are Bhagavati and Khapri Devta (Keppo) Ravalnath. 
 
Today, the temple at Shirali conducts various pujas including Shasraganayaga, Rathotsav, Ganahoma and Sahasrachandikahavana. 
The Rathotsav or the Car Festival is celebrated by the temple on Margashira Shudda Navami (in November or December.) The important events during rathotsava include pete utsava of Mahaganapathi on Margashira Shudda Chauthi and Mahamaya on Margashira Shudda Ashtami, ratri utsava every night and okuli on Margashira Shudda Dashami.

It is estimated that currently the Shirali Maha Ganapathi and Mahammaya temple has 125 Kulavis, with a total of 6000 persons. Most Kulavis visit the temple annually, and many Kulavis living abroad visit the temple every time they visit India. The temple management has built spacious rooms to accommodate Kulavis who visit the temple and also provide food to the Kulavis during their stay at the temple.

References

External links

 GSB Temples

Hindu temples in Uttara Kannada district
16th-century Hindu temples
Ganesha temples
Shakti temples